The Dirección General de Aeronáutica Civil (DGAC), in English the General Directorate of Civil Aviation, is the civil aviation authority of Costa Rica. It oversees all aspects of civil aviation operations and infrastructure within the country. The body was created by law on 26 October 1949. Its headquarters are in San José.

, the Director-General was Jorge Fernández Chacón, seconded by the Deputy Director-General, Alvaro Vargas Segura.

The agency investigates any aviation accidents and incidents that occur in Costa Rica.

See also

International Civil Aviation Organization
List of airports in Costa Rica
List of civil aviation authorities

References

External links
 
Summary audit report of the Directorate General of Civil Aviation (Costa Rica) made by the ICAO, June 2000 (Archive)

Aviation organizations based in Costa Rica
Costa Rica
Organizations investigating aviation accidents and incidents